This is a list of all the United States Supreme Court cases from volume 559 of the United States Reports:

External links

2009 in United States case law